USS LST-448 was a United States Navy  used in the Asiatic-Pacific Theater during World War II.

Construction
LST-448 was laid down on 10 July 1942, under Maritime Commission (MARCOM) contract, MC hull 968, by  Kaiser Shipyards, Vancouver, Washington; launched on 26 September 1942; and commissioned on 23 December 1942.

Service history
During the war, LST-448 was assigned to the Pacific Theater of Operations. She took part in the consolidation of the southern Solomons in June 1943, and the Vella Lavella occupation in October 1943.

The tank landing ship was damaged by Japanese dive bombers off Vella Lavella, Solomons, on 1 October, suffering some casualties among her embarked New Zealand troops. Fifteen members of a NZ anti aircraft crew were killed. The LST was taken under tow by tug  but sank while underway on 5 October, south of Vella Lavella. She was struck from the Navy list on 26 October 1943.

Honors and awards
LST-448 earned two battle stars for her World War II service.

Notes 

Citations

Bibliography 

Online resources

External links

 

LST-1-class tank landing ships
World War II amphibious warfare vessels of the United States
1942 ships
S3-M2-K2 ships
Ships built in Vancouver, Washington
Maritime incidents in October 1943